The Island of Contenda (original title: O Ilhéu de Contenda) is a 1995 drama film directed by Leão Lopes.

Synopsis
Cape Verde, 1964. At the feet of a mighty volcano, the traditional Cape Verdean society is undergoing a steady change. The old land-owning aristocracy is disintegrating. A class of mulatto begins to emerge, with a trade-based financial power that threatens the landlords. A new identity arises, a mix of old and new, of African and Portuguese culture, sensual and dynamic.

The songs of Cesária Évora follow this inevitable transformation with the beautiful landscape of Fogo, Cape Verde as scenery.

The Island of Contenda was the first feature film to be produced with the financial support of the Cape Verde national film institute (Instituto Cabo-verdiano de Cinema) that no longer exists.

It is adapted from the novel by Henrique Teixeira de Sousa.

Cast
 João Lourenço - Eusébio
 Camacho Costa - Felisberto
 Luísa Cruz - Esmeralda
 Filipe Ferrer - Alberto
 Betina Lopes - Soila
 Cecília Guimarães - Nha Noca
 Marina Albuquerque
 Henrique Espírito Santo - Governor	
 José Fanha	- Carneiro
 Laurinda Ferreira - Alice
 Leandro Ferreira	 - Father Vitório
 Isabel de Castro - Nha Caela
 Teresa Madruga - Beliha
 Luís Mascarenhas - Inspector
 Mano Preto	- Chiquinho
 Carlos Rodrigues - Augusto Foleiro
 Horácio Santos - Anacleto
 Diogo Vasconcelos
 Pedro Wilson - Dr. Vicente

Release
The film was released in 1996 in Cape Verde

Festivals
 Cabo Verde International Film Festival
Milan Film Festival, Italy (1997)
Amiens International Film Festival, November 10, 1997

Awards
Best Original Score at FESPACO - Panafrican Film and Television Festival of Ouagadougou, Burkina Faso (1997)
First Prize at Festival de Cine Internacional de Ourense, Spain (1997)

See also
Leão Lopes
Cinema of Cape Verde

References

External links
 
 New York Times review
 BFI

News articles
 At RTP (Portuguese Broadcasting Network)
  News in Público (article in Portuguese)
 News at 2ª Bienal de Culturas Lusófonas na Malaposta (article in Portuguese)
 'Ilhéu de Contenda' (article in Portuguese)
 No blog Deambulações (article in Portuguese)

1995 films
Films set in Cape Verde
Films based on Cape Verdean novels
Cape Verdean drama films
1995 drama films
Fogo, Cape Verde
1990s Portuguese-language films